Trouble or Nothin'  is a 1989 album by female artist Robin Beck. It was produced by Desmond Child and recorded and mixed by Sir Arthur Payson. This album was re-recorded and released independently in 2009 as Trouble or Nothing: 20th Anniversary Edition. An additional four songs were recorded.

Track listing

Personnel
Robin Beck - lead vocals
Guy Mann-Dude, John McCurry, Steve Lukather, Ira Siegel, Jeff Mironov - guitar
Hugh McDonald, Seth Glassman - bass
Gregg Mangiafico, Chuck Kentis, Robbie Kondor - keyboards
David Garfield - additional keyboards
Bobby Chouinard, Gavin Spencer, Steve Ferrone - drums
Alan St. Jon - organ on "Save Up All Your Tears"
Brandon Fields - saxophone on "If You Were a Woman (And I Was a Man)"
Brad Parker, Guy Mann-Dude, Paul Stanley, Richard T. Bear - gang vocals on "Save Up All Your Tears"

References

External links 
The official website of Robin Beck

Robin Beck albums
1989 albums
Mercury Records albums
Albums produced by Desmond Child